The 1990 Motorcraft Quality Parts 500 was the fourth stock car race of the 1990 NASCAR Winston Cup Series season and the 31st iteration of the event. The race was held on Sunday, March 18, 1990, before an audience of 45,000 in Hampton, Georgia, at Atlanta International Speedway, a  permanent asphalt quad-oval intermediate speedway. The race took the scheduled 328 laps to complete. On the final restart with two laps in the race, Richard Childress Racing driver Dale Earnhardt would manage to make a late-race charge to the lead, coming back from a poor final pit stop to take his 40th career NASCAR Winston Cup Series victory and his first victory of the season. To fill out the top three, Bud Moore Engineering driver Morgan Shepherd and Morgan–McClure Motorsports driver Ernie Irvan would finish second and third, respectively.

Background 

Atlanta Motor Speedway (formerly Atlanta International Raceway) is a 1.522-mile race track in Hampton, Georgia, United States, 20 miles (32 km) south of Atlanta. It has annually hosted NASCAR Winston Cup Series stock car races since its inauguration in 1960.

The venue was bought by Speedway Motorsports in 1990. In 1994, 46 condominiums were built over the northeastern side of the track. In 1997, to standardize the track with Speedway Motorsports' other two intermediate ovals, the entire track was almost completely rebuilt. The project made the track one of the fastest on the NASCAR circuit.

Entry list 

 (R) - denotes rookie driver.

Qualifying 
Two rounds of qualifying were scheduled to be held on Friday, March 16, and Saturday, March 17. However, Friday's sessions were cancelled due to rain, with both rounds then scheduled to commence on Saturday. However, Saturday's sessions would also be cancelled due to rain, leaving qualifying to be determined by a system of owner's points and postmarks on entry list blanks. The top 30 positions would be determined by the current 1990 owner's points, while the final nine spots would be determined by a system of provisionals that included past winners, and finally postmarks. As a result, Richard Childress Racing driver Dale Earnhardt would win the pole.

Three drivers would fail to qualify.

Full qualifying results

Race results

Standings after the race 

Drivers' Championship standings

Note: Only the first 10 positions are included for the driver standings.

References 

1990 NASCAR Winston Cup Series
NASCAR races at Atlanta Motor Speedway
March 1990 sports events in the United States
1990 in sports in Georgia (U.S. state)